Ali Khan Qaleh (also Romanized as ‘Alī Khān Qal‘eh; also known as Alkhān Kārā, Alkhan Qara, and Bashkanlu) is a village in Takmaran Rural District, Sarhad District, Shirvan County, North Khorasan Province, Iran. At the 2006 census, its population was 787, in 188 families.

References 

Populated places in Shirvan County